Jeanne Mary Mockford (15 March 1926 – 16 November 2018) was an English actress, probably best known as Senna the soothsayer in the British television 1969–70 comedy series Up Pompeii!.

She has made guest appearances in shows such as The Bill, Doctors, Bedsitcom, My Hero, Keeping Up Appearances, Last of the Summer Wine, The Mighty Boosh, and Casualty. She starred in Little Britain as Kenny Craig's mother, and appeared in the feature films Fourplay (2001) and Hellboy II: The Golden Army (2008).

Mockford latterly lived at Denville Hall, a retirement home for actors, where she was diagnosed with dementia. She died in November 2018 at the age of 92.

Filmography

References

External links

1926 births
2018 deaths
Actresses from London
English television actresses
Deaths from dementia in England